The Russian Album refers to Choba B CCCP, album by Paul McCartney

It may also refer to:
The Russian Album, novel by Michael Ignatieff 1977 Heinemann Award winner
Russian Album, album by Anna Netrebko
Russian Album, album by Olga Scheps